Ernest Leonard Lee (September 19, 1923 – July 8, 1977) was a provincial politician from Alberta, Canada. He served as a member of the Legislative Assembly of Alberta from 1963 to 1971 sitting with the Social Credit caucus in government.

Political career
Lee ran for a seat to the Alberta Legislature in the 1963 Alberta general election as the Social Credit candidate in the electoral district of Dunvegan. He won the district with a comfortable majority defeating two other candidates to hold it for his party. Lee ran for a second term in the 1967 Alberta general election. The election was hotly contested with Lee facing a strong challenge from NDP candidate Phil Thompson. He held his seat by a margin of 200 votes. Lee retired from the Alberta Legislature at dissolution in 1971.

References

External links
Legislative Assembly of Alberta Members Listing

Alberta Social Credit Party MLAs
1977 deaths
1923 births